Run, Run, Joe!  (also known as Joe and Margherito) is an Italian comedy movie directed in 1974 by Giuseppe Colizzi. It is the penultimate movie of Colizzi, before the posthumously released Switch. The movie reprises the style of the  movies of the popular duo Bud Spencer-Terence Hill, that the same Colizzi had launched in 1967 in God Forgives... I Don't!. It was co-produced with West Germany (where it is known as J & M - Dynamit in der Schnauze and Dufte Typen räumen auf), Spain (where it was released as Joe y Margherito) and France.

Plot 
Joe is assigned to protect Don Salvatore who is about to leave Italy for the United States. Don Salvatore has a number of enemies but Joe is supported by a new friend, the courageous mariner Margherito. But even the efforts of both of them are eventually not sufficient to keep Don Salvatore alive. Since the mafia considers Joe accountable, the new friends have to seek cover. They start to pretend they were English.

Cast 
Keith Carradine as Joe
Tom Skerritt as  Margherito
 Cyril Cusack as  Parkintosh
Sybil Danning as  Betty
José Calvo as  Don Salvatore
 Raymond Bussières as  Don Sulpicone
 Marcello Mandò as  Sapicone

See also    
 List of Italian films of 1974

References

External links

1974 films
Italian buddy comedy films
1970s buddy comedy films
Films directed by Giuseppe Colizzi
Seafaring films
Films set in the Mediterranean Sea
Films scored by Guido & Maurizio De Angelis
1974 comedy films
English-language Italian films
1970s English-language films
1970s Italian films